Humberto Gordon Rubio (21 September 1927 – 15 June 2000) was a Chilean Army general and member of the Government Junta that ruled Chile from 1973–1990.  He served on the junta as a member from 1985–1987.

References

1927 births
2000 deaths
Chilean Army generals
20th-century Chilean military personnel